Lighthouse X (pronounced "Lighthouse Ten")  was a Danish boyband consisting of Søren Bregendal, Johannes Nymark and Martin Skriver.

The band was formed in 2012 with the goal of helping people who face challenges in their lives. They work as ambassadors of three different non-profit organizations who also receive a percentage of the groups profit. They represented Denmark in the Eurovision Song Contest 2016 in Stockholm with the song "Soldiers of Love". Lighthouse X disbanded in August 2016.

Career

2014–15: Lighthouse X
On 13 October 2014 Lighthouse X released their debut single "Kærligheden kalder". The song peaked at number 37 on the Danish Singles Chart After a second single, "Hjerteløst", the band released their debut self-titled EP Lighthouse X on 16 February 2015. On 16 April 2015 they released the single "Nattens gløder". Other singles from 2015 include "It's a Brand New Day" and "Home".

2016: Eurovision Song Contest

In February 2016 the band took part in Dansk Melodi Grand Prix 2016, the music competition that selects Denmark's entries for the Eurovision Song Contest. The competition was held on 13 February 2016 at the Forum Horsens in Horsens. The band performed "Soldiers of Love" in the Final making it through to the Super final winning with 42% of the public vote.

They performed at the Eurovision Song Contest 2016 during the second semi-final on 12 May 2016,  but failed to qualify to the May 14 final of the competition. "Soldiers of Love" placed 17th in the second semi-final and scored especially poorly with juries. It kept Denmark out of the Eurovision final for the second year in a row.

Johannes Nymark, a member of the band, had previously been a keyboard player for Italy at the Eurovision Song Contest 2014.

In August 2016, the band announced that they were disbanding with a last appearance during Copenhagen Pride on 17 August 2016.

Discography

Extended plays

Singles

References

Eurovision Song Contest entrants for Denmark
Danish musical groups
Eurovision Song Contest entrants of 2016